Lowryacarus is a genus of mites in the family Acaridae.

Species
 Lowryacarus longipes Fain, 1986

References

Acaridae